Alexandria Area High School is a public high school located in Alexandria, Minnesota. The school replaced Jefferson High School. It is a part of Alexandria Public Schools.

In addition to Alexandria, it serves the cities of Carlos, Forada, Garfield, Miltona, and Nelson; and the townships of Alexandria, Belle River, Brandon, Carlos, Holmes City, Hudson, Ida, LaGrand, Lake Mary, Leaf Valley, Miltona, Moe, Osakis, and Spruce Hill. It also serves Reno Township in Pope County.

Academics

Alexandria Area High School offers more than 180 courses including college course opportunities, online selections, individualized study, and career/service mentorships.  Many of these opportunities are given through the Alexandria Technical and Community College. In 2014, a new school and an arts center were built. The new facility includes athletic fields, a stadium, and a 1,000 seat auditorium. The new high school was renamed Alexandria Area High School and was designed by JLG Architects & Cuningham Group.

Sports and activities

Alexandria offers more than 50 student activities including the full complement of Minnesota State High School League (MSHSL) offerings, featuring varsity sports, fine and performing arts, and numerous school clubs and organizations. Sports include:
 Fall: Football, Cross Country, Volleyball, Boys and Girls Soccer, Girls Tennis, and Girls Swimming/Diving.
 Winter: Boys and Girls Hockey, Boys and Girls Basketball, Boys Swimming/Diving, Dance Team, Nordic Ski and Alpine Ski, Wrestling, and Gymnastics.
 Spring: Baseball, Softball, Girls and Boys Track and Field, Girls and Boys Golf, Boys Tennis, and Adaptive Bowling.

Alexandria also has a music program, where dedicated and talented directors teach the art of music.

Notable alumni

Hal Haskins, professional basketball player
John Hawkes (actor), actor
Todd Hendricks, professional football player
Tom Lehman, professional PGA golfer
Josh Meyers (ice hockey), professional hockey player
Gary Serum, pitcher Minnesota Twins

References

External links
 

High schools in Minnesota
Educational institutions established in 1957
Schools in Douglas County, Minnesota
1957 establishments in Minnesota